Lillard is a surname of French origin. Through  Norman and Huguenot migration, it is found mostly in the British isles and their colonies.  Notable people with the surname include:

Bill Lillard (1918−2009), American baseball player
Charles Lillard (1944−1997), American-Canadian poet and historian
Damian Lillard (born 1990), American basketball player
David Lillard (born c. 1953), Tennessee state treasurer
Gene Lillard (1913−1991), American baseball player
Joe Lillard (1905−1978), American football, baseball, and basketball player
Matthew Lillard (born 1970), American actor, director and producer
W. H. Lillard (1881−1967), American football coach and educator
William Harvey Lillard (1856−1925), American janitor, first chiropractic patient

English-language surnames